Daniel "Dani" Aquino Pintos (born 27 July 1990) is a Spanish footballer who plays for San Fernando CD. Left-footed, he can play anywhere on the attacking line but usually appears as both a winger or forward.

Club career
Born in Murcia, Aquino made his professional debut for local Real Murcia at only 16 years of age, during 2006–07 in the Segunda División, against CD Tenerife; he scored in a 1–4 home loss for his only appearance of the season, which ended in promotion. In early 2007, rumours surfaced that Chelsea and Liverpool, amongst others, were after the youngster. Eventually no deals were arranged, as the player chose to stay in the country to further his development.

Aquino first appeared in La Liga on 20 January 2008, in a 3–1 away defeat to Real Zaragoza. After coach Lucas Alcaraz's dismissal and the arrival of Javier Clemente, he finished the campaign in the starting XI, and showed glimpses of an emerging talent. On 30 March he provided a cross for Quique de Lucas' opener at Deportivo de La Coruña (another 3–1 loss), and scored his first-top flight goal two months later, away against Racing de Santander – Murcia led by 2–0, lost 3–2 and ratified its relegation.

In 2008–09, Aquino was given a major role in the main squad but Murcia underachieved, battling for relegation during most of the competition and finally ranking 14th. At the end of the following season, the club finally dropped down a level and he left in June 2011, having featured sparingly in the process.

After further unsuccessful spells with Real Valladolid and Real Oviedo, Aquino moved to Atlético Madrid in mid-January 2013, and scored several goals for its C team in the Tercera División. He also caught the eye of main squad manager Diego Simeone who awarded him his first top-tier appearance in over five years on 1 June: after just a minute on the field, he assisted Diego Costa for the second goal in an eventual 3–1 win at Zaragoza.

On 10 June 2015, after scoring 17 times for Atlético's reserves in the Segunda División B, Aquino moved to CD Numancia. On 13 July of the following year, having netted only once during the whole season, he was released and signed for Racing de Santander just hours later. He netted 27 times in his first season in Cantabria, including all the goals of a 4–0 home victory over UD Mutilvera on 7 May 2017.

Aquino then had brief spells abroad with AEK Larnaca FC (Cypriot First Division) and Piast Gliwice (Polish Ekstraklasa), and a second one at Murcia. On 20 January 2020 he returned to Spain, signing with third-division club CD Badajoz with a "prohibitive buyout clause".

International career
Aquino represented Spain at both under-17 and under-19 levels. During the 2007 FIFA U-17 World Cup he scored three goals and was the nation's second-best scorer, only trailing Bojan Krkić's five.

Subsequently, Aquino appeared at the 2008 UEFA European Under-19 Championship held in the Czech Republic.

Personal life
Aquino's father, also named Daniel, was born in Argentina, but played for seven teams in Spain, most notably Murcia and Real Betis.

His younger brother Matías (born 1996) was also a forward, who competed exclusively in the lower leagues.

Career statistics

Club

Honours
Spain U17
FIFA U-17 World Cup runner-up: 2007

References

External links

1990 births
Living people
Spanish people of Argentine descent
Spanish footballers
Footballers from Murcia
Association football wingers
Association football forwards
La Liga players
Segunda División players
Segunda División B players
Tercera División players
Primera Federación players
Segunda Federación players
Real Murcia Imperial players
Real Murcia players
Real Valladolid players
Real Oviedo players
Atlético Madrid C players
Atlético Madrid B players
Atlético Madrid footballers
CD Numancia players
Racing de Santander players
CD Badajoz players
Mar Menor FC players
San Fernando CD players
Cypriot First Division players
AEK Larnaca FC players
Ekstraklasa players
Piast Gliwice players
Spain youth international footballers
Spanish expatriate footballers
Expatriate footballers in Cyprus
Expatriate footballers in Poland
Spanish expatriate sportspeople in Cyprus
Spanish expatriate sportspeople in Poland